Sumie Ishitaka (石高 澄恵 Ishitaka Sumie, née Sumie Yokoyama 横山由紀, born September 27, 1966) is a Japanese women's professional shogi player ranked 2-dan.

Promotion history
Ishitaka's promotion history is as follows.
 Women's Professional Apprentice League: 1985
 3-kyū: March 1, 1987
 1-kyū: March 1, 1989
 1-dan: February 26, 1992
 2-dan: April 1, 2000

Note: All ranks are women's professional ranks.

Awards and honors
Ishitaka received the Japan Shogi Association's received the "25 Years Service Award" in recognition of being an active professional for twenty-five years in 2011.

References

External links

 ShogiHub: Ishitaka, Sumie
 

Japanese shogi players
Living people
Women's professional shogi players
1966 births
People from Hokkaido
Professional shogi players from Hokkaido